Francis Thomas Ryan (April 6, 1862June 14, 1927) was an American sailor serving in the United States Navy during the Boxer Rebellion who received the Medal of Honor for bravery. His birth name was Frank Gallagher.

Biography
Ryan was born April 6, 1862, in Massachusetts, and after entering the navy he was sent as a Coxswain to China to fight in the Boxer Rebellion.

He died June 14, 1927, at the age of 65, and is buried in Arlington National Cemetery Arlington, Virginia.

Medal of Honor
Francis's rank and organization are as follows: Coxswain, U.S. Navy. Born: 6 April 1868, Massachusetts. Accredited to: Massachusetts. G.O. No.: 55, 19 July 1901.

Citation 
 In action with the relief expedition of the Allied forces in China during the battles of 13, 20, 21 and 22 June 1900. Throughout this period and in the presence of the enemy, Ryan distinguished himself by meritorious conduct.

See also

List of Medal of Honor recipients
List of Medal of Honor recipients for the Boxer Rebellion

References

External links

1862 births
1927 deaths
Military personnel from Massachusetts
United States Navy Medal of Honor recipients
United States Navy sailors
American military personnel of the Boxer Rebellion
Burials at Arlington National Cemetery
Boxer Rebellion recipients of the Medal of Honor